Michael Gonzales may refer to:
Mike Gonzales (born 1964), American athlete
Michael C. Gonzales, American diplomat
Michael Dean Gonzales (born 1973), American murderer on death row
Michael Gonzales (screenwriter) in Black Eagle (1988 film)
Michael Gonzales (athlete) represented Puerto Rico at the 2002 Winter Olympics

See also
Mike Gonzalez (disambiguation)